Réka Castle; is a ruined castle in Baranya county, Hungary. It has been identified as the possible place of refuge for members of the royal family of England in the eleventh century.

The ruins of Réka Castle are near Mecseknádasd, on a hilltop marked with a cross, towards the opening to Old Mine's Valley (Óbányai-völgy).

History 

According to local folklore, Prince Edward of England arrived in Hungary during the reign of St Stephen. Edward was given an estate called "Terra Britanorum de Nadasd", which contained Réka Castle. A deed of gift issued by Andrew II in 1235 gave land bordering this territory to the Roman Catholic Diocese of Pécs.

Construction 

According to experts, the approximately 200 metre long and 36 metre wide courtyard was surrounded by a 3-metre thick stone wall. The round tower foundation discovered in the excavations probably are the remnants of the guards' post. The central section of the courtyard was enclosed by a row of buildings behind which there was a 10-metre-wide ditch along the side of the outer castle. This row was presumably single-storey with a shingled roof. The remnants of a multi-storey tower were uncovered on the side of the outer castle. The precise time of its construction is still under debate. It is thought to be of Illyrian or Celtic origins or rooted in the later 9th century Frankish architecture. The first charter referring to the castle dates from 1309. The circumstances of its destruction are unknown (The castle was possibly burnt down at the Turkish age (16th-17th century)). The locals took what was left of it to build homes and mills.

References 

11th century in Hungary
History of Baranya (region)
Baranya (region)
Ruined castles in Hungary